RMT or R. M. T. may refer to:

Business and organizations
 RMT, common term for the National Union of Rail, Maritime and Transport Workers, a UK trade union
 Redcliffe Musical Theatre, a theater company in Queensland, Australia 
 Regie voor Maritiem Transport, a former Belgian state-owned ferry company
 Régiment de marche du Tchad, a unit of the French Army
 Reverse Morris Trust, a form of merger and acquisition transaction

People
 Ruth Mary Tristram (1886–1950), British amateur botanist and spiritualist
 Rhian Touyz (1959–), South African fellow doctor
 RmT Sambandham (1934–2007), Indian newspaper editor

Medicine and science
 Radioactive Microsphere Therapy (RMT), a therapy in the treatment of Neuroendocrine tumors
 Recovered-memory therapy, controversial techniques used to recover memories
 Registered Massage Therapist
 Relational models theory, a theory of interpersonal relationships
 Resource mobilization theory, a theory of social movements
 Respiratory Muscle Training (RMT), method developed to condition respiration muscles using Training Masks

Transportation
 Rimatara Airport (IATA code RMT), Rimitara, French Polynesia
 RMT, the EASA aeronautical abbreviation for Rule Making Task 
 RMT Bateleur, German ultralight and light-sport aircraft manufactured by RMT Aviation
 Review of Maritime Transport (RMT), an annual publication of the United Nations

Other uses
 RateMyTeachers, a review site used to rate teachers' popularity and performance
 Real-money trading, a type of virtual economy in online gaming